Zirconium disilicide is an inorganic chemical compound with the chemical formula ZrSi2, consisting of zirconium and silicon atoms.

References

Transition metal silicides
Zirconium(II) compounds